Principlists Pervasive Coalition was one of two main principlist coalitions for the 2008 Iranian legislative election, alongside the United Front of Principlists. Candidates endorsed by the coalition were close to Ali Larijani, Mohammad Bagher Ghalibaf and Mohsen Rezaee.

Beliefs
Iranian "Principalists", or conservatives, emphasize their loyalty to the system of "Guardianship", or rule, by Islamic Jurists established by Ayatollah Ruhollah Khomeini. They support Supreme Leader Ali Khamenei and want to preserve the power of the Islamic jurist Supreme Leader. They split from the United Principalists Front in the run up to the Iranian legislative election of 2008 because they believed the pro-Ahmadinejad Sweet Scent of Service faction had been given too many top positions on the electoral lists. However, many candidates are endorsed by both the Broad Coalition and the United Principalists. They have also said that the Parliament of Iran should be more independent from the President of Iran.

Backers
The coalition is believed to be backed by Mayor of Tehran Mohammad Baqer Qalibaf, the former head of the Revolutionary Guards Mohsen Rezaee and the former nuclear negotiator Ali Larijani.

References

Defunct political party alliances in Iran
Electoral lists for Iranian legislative election, 2008
Principlist political groups in Iran